Caterina is a feminine given name which is an Italian form of the name Katherine. Notable people with the name include:

In music:

 Caterina Assandra, Italian composer and Benedictine nun
 Caterina Bueno, Italian singer and folk music historian
 Caterina Caselli, Italian singer and music producer
 Caterina Cavalieri, Austrian soprano
 Caterina Jarboro, pioneering African American opera singer
 Caterina Valente, French-born singer and dancer

In education:

 Caterina Mieras, teacher at the Teacher Training School of the Balearic Islands

In acting:

 Caterina Murino, Italian actress
 Caterina Scorsone, Canadian actress

In sports:
 Kateřina Baďurová, Czech pole vaulter
 Kateryna Bondarenko, Ukrainian tennis player

In other fields:

 Caterina Appiani, lady of Piombino
 Caterina Consani, Italian mathematician
 Caterina dei Virgi, aristocratic Bolognese woman raised in the court of Bologna
 Caterina Fake, American businesswoman and entrepreneur
 Caterina Sforza, countess of Forlì

In literature:

 Caterina "Hornet" Grimani, character in Cornelia Funke's novel The Thief Lord

Songs about people named Caterina
"Caterina" by Perry Como, 1962
"Aman Caterina mou" by Haris Alexiou
"Caterina Caterinaki" by Michalis Rakintzis
"Pame gia ypno Caterina" by Giannis Poulopoulos
"Vgainei i Caterina" by Aliki Vougiouklaki and Lavrentis Dianellos
"Aummo Aummo" by Renzo Arbore

References

Italian feminine given names